Kwun-Ling Chow was an American-Cantonese-born Chinese actress and opera singer.

Early life 
In 1924, Chow was born in the United States. Chow grew up in California.

Career 
At an early age, Chow performed Cantonese opera in San Francisco, California and other West Coast cities in the United States. In 1946, Chow crossed over as an actress at Grandview Film Company Limited (U.S. Branch) in California, and the films were released in Hong Kong. Chow first appeared in The Entangling Ones, a 1946 comedy film directed by Chiu Shu-San. Chow's first appeared as a lead Cantonese opera singer in Happy Wedding, a 1947 Cantonese opera film directed by Chiang Wai-Kwong. Chow's last film was The Dragon and the Bat, a 1964 Historical Drama film directed by Yeung Hak. Chow is credited with over 180 films.

In the 1950s, Chow became a businesswoman in the restaurant business.

Filmography

Films 
This is a partial list of films.
 1946 The Entangling Ones 
 1947 Happy Wedding 
 1947 Lucky Bride
 1949 The Ancient Beauty, Meng Lijun 
 1953 The Marriage of the Fool's Daughter 
 1953 Why Not Return? (aka The Reunion of a Bitter Couple) 
 1962 The Capture of the Evil Demons 
 1962 Girl in Danger 
 1964 The Dragon and the Bat

Personal life 
In 1947, Chow moved to Hong Kong. Chow's husband was Wong Chiu-Miu, an actor. In the 1950s, Chow and her family returned to California.

References

External links 
 Kunling Zhou at imdb.com
 Chow Kwan Ling at hkcinemagic.com
 Chow Kwun-Ling at senscritique.com
 Image of Patricia Joe with Joe Sunn Jue and Joseph Jue at ericbrightwell.com (archive)

1924 births
2020 deaths
Actresses from San Francisco
American actresses of Chinese descent
American film actresses
Cantonese opera actresses
Hong Kong film actresses